Irving Joseph Moore (April 7, 1919 – July 2, 1993) was an American television director.

Moore was born in Chicago, Illinois, and grew up in Hollywood, California. He began work as a messenger for Columbia Pictures, eventually becoming an assistant director. In 1957 he directed an episode of the American western television series Tales of the Texas Rangers.

Moore later directed other television programs including Maverick, Bonanza, The Wild Wild West, Hawaii Five-O, Gunsmoke, Eight Is Enough, Hogan's Heroes, Here Come the Brides, Lost in Space, The Guns of Will Sonnett, Perry Mason and 77 Sunset Strip. He also directed for soap operas such as Dynasty and Dallas. His last credit as director was in 1991.

Moore died in July 1993 of heart failure in Sherman Oaks, California, at the age of 74.

References

External links 

1919 births
1993 deaths
People from Chicago
American television directors